Cerritosaurus is a genus of proterochampsid archosauromorph from the Late Triassic. It has been found in the Santa Maria Formation, in the Geopark of Paleorrota, Brazil. It is represented by one species.

It was collected in 1941 by Antonio Binsfeld, in Sanga da Alemoa. Nearby, there is a small mountain called the Cerrito, after which the genus is named.

References

Further reading 
 The Beginning of the Age of Dinosaurs: Faunal Change across the Triassic-Jurassic Boundary by Kevin Padian

Proterochampsians
Prehistoric reptile genera
Carnian genera
Norian genera
Late Triassic reptiles of South America
Triassic Brazil
Fossils of Brazil
Santa Maria Formation
Fossil taxa described in 1946
Taxa named by Llewellyn Ivor Price